The 2012–13 IPFW Mastodons men's basketball team represented Indiana University – Purdue University Fort Wayne during the 2012–13 NCAA Division I men's basketball season. The Mastodons, led by second year head coach Tony Jasick, played their home games at Allen County War Memorial Coliseum and were members of The Summit League. They finished the season 16–17, 7–9 in The Summit League play to finish in fifth place. They advanced to the semifinals of The Summit League tournament where they lost to South Dakota State.

Roster

Schedule

|-
!colspan=9| Exhibition

|-
!colspan=9| Regular season

|-
!colspan=9| 2013 The Summit League men's basketball tournament

References

Purdue Fort Wayne Mastodons men's basketball seasons
IPFW
Mast
Mast